The first aerial circumnavigation of the world was completed in 1924 by four aviators from an eight-man team of the United States Army Air Service, the precursor of the United States Air Force. The team generally traveled east to west, around the northern-Pacific Rim, through to South Asia and Europe and back to the United States. Airmen Lowell H. Smith and Leslie P. Arnold, and Erik H. Nelson and John Harding Jr. made the trip in two single-engined open-cockpit Douglas World Cruisers (DWC) configured as floatplanes for most of the journey. Four more flyers in two additional DWC began the journey but their aircraft crashed or were forced down. All airmen survived.  

In 1930, Australian Charles Kingsford Smith with a team of three others completed the first circumnavigation of the world by flight traversing both hemispheres, including the first trans-Pacific flight, from the US to Australia, in 1928.  Kingsford Smith flew a Fokker F.VIIb/3m trimotor monoplane.

U.S. preparation for circumnavigation attempt
In the early 1920s several countries were vying to be the first to fly around the world. The British had made one unsuccessful around-the-world air flight attempt in 1922. The following year, a French team had tried; the Italians, Portuguese, and British also announced plans for a world-circling flight. In the spring of 1923, the U.S. Army Air Service became interested in having a squadron of military aircraft undertake a round-the-world flight. It assigned a group of officers in the War Department planning group, formed as the World Flight Committee, the job of finding a suitable aircraft and planning the mission.  This high-level Army enterprise, under the ultimate command of General Patrick, would ultimately have the additional support of the Navy, Diplomatic Corps, Bureau of Fisheries and Coast Guard Services.

The War Department instructed the Air Service to look at both the Fokker T-2 transport and the Davis-Douglas Cloudster to see if either would be suitable and to acquire examples for testing. Although deemed satisfactory, the planning group considered other U.S. Air Service military aircraft both in service and production, with a view that a dedicated design that could be fitted with interchangeable landing gear, wheeled and pontoons for water landings, would be preferable.

When the head of Davis-Douglas, Donald Douglas, was asked for information on the Davis-Douglas Cloudster, he instead submitted data on a modified DT-2, a torpedo bomber that Douglas had built for the U.S. Navy in 1921 and 1922. The DT-2 had proven to be a sturdy aircraft that could accommodate interchangeable wheeled and pontoon landing gear. Since the aircraft was an existing model, Douglas stated that a new aircraft, which he named the Douglas World Cruiser (DWC), could be delivered within 45 days after a contract was awarded. The Air Service agreed and sent Lieutenant Erik Henning Nelson (1888–1970), a member of the planning group, to California to work out the details with Douglas. 

Douglas, assisted by Jack Northrop, began to modify a DT-2 to suit the circumnavigation requirements. The main modification involved its fuel capacity. All the internal bomb carrying structures were removed with additional fuel tanks added to the wings and fuselage fuel tanks enlarged in the aircraft. The total fuel capacity went from 115 gallons (435 liters) to 644 gallons (2,438 liters).

Lt. Nelson took the Douglas proposal to Washington where Major General Mason M. Patrick, Chief of the Air Service, approved it on 1 August 1923. The War Department awarded an initial contract to Douglas for the construction of a single prototype. The prototype met all expectations, and a contract was awarded for four more production aircraft and spare parts. The last DWC was delivered on 11 March 1924. The spare parts included 15 extra Liberty engines, 14 extra sets of pontoons, and enough replacement airframe parts for two more aircraft. These spare parts were sent ahead to locations along the route around the world the aircraft planned to follow.

The aircraft were equipped with no radios nor avionics of any sort, leaving their crew to rely entirely on their dead reckoning skills to navigate throughout the venture.

Douglas World Cruiser aircraft and crew

 Seattle (No. 1): Maj. Frederick L. Martin (1882–1956), pilot and flight commander, and SSgt. Alva L. Harvey (1900–1992), flight mechanic (failed to circumnavigate)
 Chicago (No. 2): Lt. Lowell H. Smith (1892–1945), pilot, subsequent flight commander, and 1st Lt. Leslie P. Arnold (1893–1961), co-pilot
 Boston (No. 3)/Boston II (prototype): 1st Lt. Leigh P. Wade (1897–1991), pilot, and SSgt. Henry H. Ogden (1900–1986), flight mechanic (failed to circumnavigate)
 New Orleans (No. 4): Lt. Erik H. Nelson (1888–1970), pilot, and Lt. John Harding Jr. (1896–1968), co-pilot

The pilots trained in meteorology and navigation at Langley Field in Virginia, where they also practiced in the prototype.   From February to March 1924, the crews practiced on the production aircraft at the Douglas facility in Santa Monica and in San Diego.

Team circumnavigation
Four aircraft, Seattle, Chicago, Boston, and New Orleans, left Clover Field, Santa Monica, California, on 17 March 1924, for Sand Point in Seattle, Washington, the official start of the journey. The individual aircraft were formally christened with waters from their namesake cities, prior to departure from Seattle where Boeing Company technicians configured the aircraft for the long over-water portion of the flight, by exchanging wheels for pontoon floats.

On 6 April 1924, just 13 days after the British, under Stuart-MacLaren, set off from England in the opposite direction, they left Seattle for Alaska. Shortly after departing Prince Rupert Island on 15 April, the lead aircraft Seattle, flown by Martin with Harvey (the only fully qualified mechanic in the flight), blew a  hole in its crankcase and was forced to land on Portage Bay. A replacement engine having been provided, the crew resumed their journey on 25 April, in an attempt to catch up with the other three aircraft awaiting in Dutch Harbor but which ended in failure on 30 April when the Seattle crashed in dense fog into a mountainside near Port Moller on the Alaska Peninsula.  It was destroyed in the crash.  The crew survived six harrowing days in the elements before finding shelter in an unoccupied cabin on Moller Bay and made it to a cannery four days later.

The three remaining aircraft continued, with Chicago, flown by Smith and Arnold, assuming the lead.  Tracing the Aleutian Islands, the flight traveled across the North Pacific, landing in the Soviet Union notwithstanding the lack of entry permission.  The Aleuts of Atka applied the term "thunder-bird" from their mythology to the Cruisers. 

On 25 May, whilst in Tokyo, the team received a cable reporting "MacLaren crashed at Akyab [Burma].  Plane completely wrecked.  Continuance of flight doubtful."  They responded by arranging delivery of a spare plane from Tokyo to Akyab (Sittwe) on the USS John Paul Jones, transshipped in Hong Kong onto the USS William B Preston, enabling the British to continue in their attempt to be first, as the Portuguese and Argentinians also pressed on.

The aircraft continued relatively uneventfully via Korea and down the coast of China to French Indochina (now Vietnam).

After leaving Haiphong in the Gulf of Tonkin, the Chicago engine broke a connecting rod and it was forced to land in a lagoon near Huế. The aircraft was considered a novelty in this region of the world and missionary priests supplied the pilots with food and wine while locals climbed aboard its pontoons. The other flyers, who had continued on to Tourane (Da Nang), searched for the Chicago by boat and found the crew sitting on the wing in the early morning hours.

The flight continued through Thailand and on to Burma where they came within earshot of MacLaren during a torrential downpour east of Akyab, MacLaren having just resumed his attempt in the aircraft delivered by the Americans and sheltering on the surface at the time.  Visual contact was not made and the Americans were unaware of their proximity to MacLaren.

After carrying out the major operation of exchanging the Cruisers' floats for wheeled undercarriage at Calcutta, misfortune struck the Chicago crew on the evening of 29 June when Smith, in the dark after dinner, slipped and broke a rib.  He nevertheless insisted on continuing without delaying the mission.  All three aircraft were fitted with new engines in Karachi, the New Orleans having suffered a catastrophic engine failure just short of that city and limped in on intermittent power.

They then proceeded into the Middle East and then Europe.

The flight arrived in Paris on Bastille Day, 14 July. From Paris the aircraft flew to London and on to the north of England in order to prepare for the Atlantic Ocean crossing by re-installing pontoons and changing engines.

On 3 August 1924, en route from the Orkney Islands to Iceland, an oil pump failure forced the Boston down onto an uninviting sea less than halfway to the Faroes. The accompanying Chicago flew on to the Faroes where it dropped a note onto the supporting U.S. Navy light cruiser USS Richmond about the troubled aircraft. The crew having been rescued unhurt, the Boston, then on tow, capsized and sank shortly before reaching the Faroes.  The Chicago and New Orleans had flown on to Hornafjörður, Iceland, the most northerly point of the circumnavigation (65 deg N).

After a long stay in Reykjavik, Iceland, where they fortuitously met Italian Antonio Locatelli and his crew, also in the course of the same circumnavigation attempt, and there accompanied by five navy vessels and their 2,500 seaman, the Chicago, with Smith and Arnold still in the lead, and the New Orleans, with Nelson and Harding, continued on for Fredricksdal, Greenland.  This was to be the longest leg of the entire journey, with those five vessels strung along the route.  New engines were installed on arrival at the second stop in Greenland, Ivigtut.

On 31 August, they reached Labrador, Canada, a fuel-pump failure in the Chicago having been overcome by four hours of hand pumping by Arnold.  After the original prototype, now named Boston II, arrived in Pictou, Nova Scotia, the original Boston crew of Wade and Ogden were able to join the other two aircraft to fly on to Boston (where pontoon floats were exchanged for wheels again) and Washington DC. After a hero's welcome in the capital, the three Douglas World Cruisers flew to the West Coast, on a multi-city tour, stopping, on 22 September, at Rockwell Field, San Diego, for new engines and then arrived in Santa Monica to a welcoming crowd of 100 to 250 thousand.  Their final landing in Seattle was on 28 September 1924.

The trip had taken 363 flying hours 7 minutes, over 175 calendar days, and covered , succeeding where the British, Portuguese, French, Italians and Argentinians failed.  The Douglas Aircraft Company adopted the motto, "First Around the World – First the World Around".  The American team had greatly increased their chances of success by using several aircraft and pre-positioning large caches of fuel, spare parts, and other support equipment along the route. They often had several US Navy destroyers deployed in support.  At prearranged way points, the World Flight's aircraft had their engines changed five times and new wings fitted twice.

Itinerary

The flight traveled from East to West, beginning in Seattle, Washington, in April 1924 and returning to its start point in September.  It flew northwest to Alaska across northern-Pacific islands to Japan and then south-Asia, across to Europe and the Atlantic Ocean.  The route's most southerly point was Saigon (10 deg N) and only briefly south of the Tropic of Cancer, the refueling stops being:

 United States: Sand Point, Lake Washington, Seattle, Washington 6 April 1924
 Canada: Seal Cove, Prince Rupert, British Columbia
 Alaska: Sitka, Seward and Chignik
 Aleutian Islands: Dutch Harbor, Atka and Attu
 Soviet Union: Bering Island
 Japan: Paramushiru, Hitokappu, Minato, Lake Kasumigaura, Kushimoto and Kagoshima
 China: Shanghai, Tchinkoen (Qingchuan) Bay, Amoy (Xiamen)
 Hong Kong
 French Indochina (Vietnam): Gulf of Tonkin (Haiphong), Tourane (Da Nang), (Chicago only) Huế and Saigon (Ho Chi Minh City)

 Thailand: Bangkok
 Raj Burma: Tavoy (Dawei), Rangoon and Akyab (Sittwe)
Raj India: Chittagong, Calcutta, Allahabad, Ambala, Multan, Karachi
 Persia: Chabahar, Bandar Abbas and Bushehr
Iraq: Baghdad
 Syria: Aleppo
 Turkey: Istanbul

 Romania: Bucharest
 Hungary: Budapest
 Austria: Vienna
 France: Strasbourg and Paris
 England: Croydon (London) and Brough (Yorkshire)
 Scotland: Scapa Flow (Kirkwall), Orkney Islands
 Iceland: Hornafjörður and Reykjavik
 Greenland: Fredricksdal and Ivigtut (Ivittuut)
 Newfoundland and Labrador: Icy Tickle and Hawkes Bay
 Canada: Pictou Harbor, Nova Scotia
 United States: Casco Bay, Maine; Boston, Massachusetts; Mitchell Field, New York; Bolling Field, Washington, D.C. Across the U.S. – 14 cities in nine states; and Seattle, Washington: 28 September 1924

Subsequent disposition of equipment and crew

At the request of the Smithsonian Institution, the U.S. War Department transferred ownership of the Chicago to the museum for display. It made its last flight from Dayton, Ohio to Washington, D.C. on 25 September 1925. It was almost immediately put on display in the Smithsonian's Arts and Industries Building. In 1974, the Chicago was restored under the direction of Walter Roderick, and transferred to the new National Air and Space Museum building for display in their Barron Hilton Pioneers of Flight exhibition gallery.

Beginning in 1957, the New Orleans was displayed at the National Museum of the United States Air Force in Dayton. The aircraft was on loan from the Los Angeles County Museum of Natural History and was returned in 2005. Since February 2012, the New Orleans is a part of the exhibits at the Museum of Flying in Santa Monica, California.

The wreckage of the Seattle was recovered and is now on display in the Alaska Aviation Heritage Museum. The original Boston sank in the North Atlantic, and it is thought that the only surviving piece of the original prototype, the Boston II, is the aircraft data plate, now in a private collection, and a scrap of fuselage skin, in the collection of the Vintage Wings & Wheels Museum in Poplar Grove, Illinois.

All six airmen were awarded the Distinguished Service Medal by vote of the United States Congress, the first time such award had been made for acts not in the course of war, and they were excused from the prohibition against accepting awards from foreign countries.

The best in flight Mackay Trophy for 1924 was awarded to Smith, Arnold, Wade, Nelson and Ogden. Later, Martin was in command of Army aviation units in Hawaii at the time of the Japanese attack on Pearl Harbor. His mechanic Harvey was commissioned and commanded heavy bomb groups during World War II. Nelson rose to the rank of colonel and became one of General Henry Arnold's chief trouble-shooters on the development and operational deployment of the Boeing B-29 Superfortress.

Cross-equator circumnavigation

The first aerial circumnavigation of the world that involved the crossing of the equator twice was made using a single aircraft, the Southern Cross, a Fokker F.VIIb/3m trimotor monoplane crewed by Charles Kingsford Smith (lead pilot), Charles Ulm (relief pilot), James Warner (radio operator), and Harry Lyon (navigator and engineer).

After completing the first trans-Pacific crossing on 9 June 1928, flying from Oakland, California to Brisbane, Australia, Kingsford Smith and Ulm spent several months making other long-distance flights across Australia and to New Zealand. They decided to use their trans-Pacific flight as the first leg of a globe-circling flight. They flew the Southern Cross to England in June 1929, then across the Atlantic and North America, returning, in 1930, to Oakland where their trans-Pacific flight had begun.

Before Kingsford Smith's death in 1935, he donated the Southern Cross to the Commonwealth of Australia, for display in a museum. The aircraft is preserved in a special glass 'hangar' memorial on Airport Drive, near the International Terminal at Brisbane Airport in Queensland, Australia.

See also
 List of circumnavigations: Aerial

References

Notes

Citations

Bibliography

 Boyne, Walter J. The Aircraft Treasures Of Silver Hill: The Behind-The-Scenes Workshop Of The National Air And Space Museum. New York: Rawson Associates, 1982. .
 Bryan, Courtlandt Dixon Barnes. The National Air and Space Museum. New York: Harry N. Abrams, Inc., 1979. .
 Cross, Roy. Great Aircraft and Their Pilots. New York: New York Graphic Society, 1972.  .
 Donald, David, ed. Encyclopedia of World Aircraft. Etobicoke, Ontario: Prospero Books, 1997. .
 Francillon, René J. McDonnell Douglas Aircraft Since 1920: Volume I. London: Putnam, 1979. .
 Haber, Barbara Angle. The National Air and Space Museum. London: Bison Group, 1995. .
 Mackworth-Praed, Ben. Aviation: The Pioneer Years. London: Studio Editions, 1990. .
 Ogden, Bob. Great Aircraft Collections of the World. New York: Gallery Books, 1986. .
 Stoff, Joshua. Transatlantic Flight: A Picture History, 1873–1939. Mineoloa, New York: Dover publications, Inc., 2000. .
 Swanborough, F. Gordon and Peter M. Bowers. United States Military Aircraft since 1909. London: Putnam, 1963.
 Wendell, David V. "Getting Its Wings: Chicago as the Cradle of Aviation in America." Journal of the Illinois State Historical Society, Volume 92, No. 4, Winter 1999/2000, pp. 339–372.
 Will, Gavin. The Big Hop: The North Atlantic Air Race. Portugal Cove-St.Phillips, Newfoundland: Boulder Publications, 2008. .
 Yenne, Bill. Seaplanes & Flying Boats: A Timeless Collection from Aviation's Golden Age. New York: BCL Press, 2003. .

External links

 The Douglas World Cruiser – Around the World in 175 Days
 The National Archives: Magellans of the Sky
 USAF Museum: World Flight Chronicle
 Santa Monica Museum of Flying
 Chasing the Sun: Douglas Aircraft, PBS documentary

1924 in aviation
20th-century history of the United States Air Force
Circumnavigations